Grásteinn ('grey stone') is a stone on Álftanes, near Reykjavík in Iceland. At Grandinn when driving from Garðabær to Álftanes is a crossroads. Bessastaðir is to the right, Suðurnesvegur to the left and Norðurnesvegur straight forward. To the south of this crossroads is the marker-stone Grásteinn, which is a load stone. On the stone are marks showing that someone has tried to move from its place or break it down. But history relates that one time there was an attempt to move it from its place, it seemed to people that Eyvindarstaði was in the midst of a bright conflagration, and they halted the move. Grásteinn is also associated with the belief that things will go well for the wayfarer who passes it carefully.

The Elf-Stones are several stones to the south of Grásteinn. Elves are supposed to live in them. Grásteinn is portrayed in the film Sumarlandið by Grimur Hákonarson, where it is Grásteinn itself that is the elf-stone.

Icelandic folklore
Elves